Goatlord is a demo album by Norwegian band Darkthrone, released in 1996. The album was re-released by Peaceville Records in 2011, with new artwork approved by the band and a second disc containing commentary from Fenriz and Nocturno Culto.

Background
Goatlord was written in 1990 as the follow-up to Darkthrone's death metal debut album, Soulside Journey, and was recorded in late 1990 and early 1991 as an instrumental rehearsal tape. The album was scrapped when the band changed style from death metal to black metal in favor of A Blaze in the Northern Sky. Most of the lyrics for Goatlord were written in the autumn of 1990, with some additions in 1994 for the last two songs. The vocals were recorded in 1994 by Fenriz. The female-sounding vocals were also recorded by him, partly using pitch shifting. Satyr of the band Satyricon is credited for the opening screams in "Rex" and "Sadomasochistic Rites".

The original 1991 instrumental rehearsal recording was remastered as Goatlord: Original, and scheduled for release with new cover art by Peaceville Records in February 2023. This reissue of the album featured alternate song titles from previous releases, as well as an instrumental version of the track "A Blaze in the Northern Sky".

Track listing

Personnel
 Fenriz – lead vocals, drums
 Nocturno Culto – lead guitar
 Dag Nilsen – bass guitar
 Zephyrous – rhythm guitar
 Satyr – backing vocals

References

Darkthrone albums
1996 albums
Demo albums
Death metal albums by Norwegian artists